The Woonsocket Civil War Monument is a historic site at Monument Square in Woonsocket, Rhode Island. It was built to memorialize thirty-nine fallen soldiers from Woonsocket who took part in the Civil War.

Built in 1868 by James G. Batterson, this Civil War memorial was the first Civil War monument constructed in Rhode Island. The monument is made out of granite and is topped with a statue of a Civil War soldier. The names of the battles in which Woonsocket soldiers fought are inscribed on the monument. The monument was added to the National Register of Historic Places in 1982.

See also
 1868 in art
National Register of Historic Places listings in Providence County, Rhode Island

References

1868 establishments in Rhode Island
1868 sculptures
Bronze sculptures in Rhode Island
Buildings and structures in Woonsocket, Rhode Island
Monuments and memorials in Rhode Island
Monuments and memorials on the National Register of Historic Places in Rhode Island
National Register of Historic Places in Providence County, Rhode Island
Outdoor sculptures in Rhode Island
Statues in Rhode Island
Sculptures of men in Rhode Island
Union (American Civil War) monuments and memorials in Rhode Island